In mathematical logic, given an unsatisfiable  Boolean propositional formula in conjunctive normal form, a subset of clauses whose conjunction is still unsatisfiable is called an unsatisfiable core of the original formula.

Many SAT solvers can produce a resolution graph which proves the unsatisfiability of the original problem.  This can be analyzed to produce a smaller unsatisfiable core.

An unsatisfiable core is called  a minimal unsatisfiable core, if every proper subset (allowing removal of any arbitrary clause or clauses) of it is satisfiable.  Thus, such a core is a local minimum, though not necessarily a global one.  There are several practical methods of computing minimal unsatisfiable cores.

A minimum unsatisfiable core contains the smallest number of the original clauses required to still be unsatisfiable.  No practical algorithms for computing the minimum core are known.  Notice the terminology: whereas the minimal unsatisfiable core was a local problem with an easy solution, the minimum unsatisfiable core is a global problem with no known easy solution.

References 

Propositional calculus